John Budd may refer to:
 John Budd (politician), Australian politician
 John Budd (water polo), British water polo player
 John M. Budd, American railroad executive
 Johnny Budd (John Walter Budd), American football player